Warner Bros.-Seven Arts, Inc. was  a short-lived American entertainment company active from 1967 until 1969.

History 
Seven Arts Productions acquired Jack L. Warner's controlling interest in Warner Bros. Pictures for $32 million in November 1966. The merger between two companies was completed by July 15, 1967, and the combined company was named Warner Bros.-Seven Arts.

The acquisition included the black and white Looney Tunes (plus the non-Harman and Ising Merrie Melodies) library, Warner Bros. Records (which was renamed Warner Bros.-Seven Arts Records), and Reprise Records. Later that same year, Warner Bros.-Seven Arts purchased Atlantic Records. Those record labels were combined in 1971 with two other acquisitions (Elektra Records and its sister label Nonesuch Records) in a new holding company, Warner-Elektra-Atlantic, under the direction of Mo Ostin and Joe Smith.

The head of production was Kenneth Hyman, son of Seven Arts co-founder Eliot Hyman. The first film of production and distribution was Reflections in a Golden Eye. Cool Hand Luke was the final film produced by Warner Bros. Pictures before and after changing its name.

Acquisition by Kinney 
On July 4, 1969, Warner Bros.-Seven Arts was acquired by Kinney National Company, and, in August that year, Ted Ashley became the chairman of the film studio. On December 16, 1969, Warner Bros.-Seven Arts was rebranded as Warner Bros. Inc.

The final film to be released under the Warner Bros.-Seven Arts name was Frankenstein Must Be Destroyed, which was released in February 1970. The studio's next film, Woodstock, which was released in March, was credited as a Warner Bros. production, and this credit would be applied to all other productions from the studio afterward with Warner Bros. reestablished as a major film studio.

In September 1971, due to a financial scandal in its parking lot operation business, Kinney National spun off its non-entertainment assets as National Kinney Corporation, and changed its name to Warner Communications Inc. on February 10, 1972.

Filmography 

 The Shuttered Room (1967)
 Bonnie and Clyde (1967)
 Camelot (1967)
 Reflections in a Golden Eye (1967)
 Wait Until Dark (1967)
 Cool Hand Luke (1967)
 The Cats (1968)
 Firecreek (1968)
 Countdown (1968)
 Norman Normal (1968)
 Bye Bye Braverman (1968)
 Kona Coast (1968)
 Chubasco (1968)
 Petulia (1968)
 The Heart Is a Lonely Hunter (1968)
 The Green Berets (1968)
 Assignment to Kill (1968)
 I Love You, Alice B. Toklas (1968)
 Rachel, Rachel (1968)
 Finian's Rainbow (1968)
 Bullitt (1968)
 Sweet November (1968)
 The Sea Gull (1968)
 The Sergeant (1968)
 Dracula Has Risen from the Grave (1968); with Hammer Films
 The Picasso Summer (1969)
 The Big Bounce (1969)
 2000 Years Later (1969)
 The Wild Bunch (1969)
 The Learning Tree (1969)
 The Rain People (1969)
 The Valley of Gwangi (1969); with Hammer Films
 The Great Bank Robbery (1969)
 Moon Zero Two (1969); with Hammer Films
 Once You Kiss a Stranger (1969)
 The Sweet Body of Deborah (1969)
 The Arrangement (1969)
 Jeff (1969); with Alain Delon's Adel Productions
 Looney Tunes and Merrie Melodies shorts (1967–69); produced by Warner Bros.-Seven Arts Animation 
 The Rise and Rise of Michael Rimmer (1970); with David Paradine Productions and London Weekend Television
 Crescendo (1970)
 Last of the Mobile Hot Shots (1970)
 Start the Revolution Without Me (1970)
 Frankenstein Must Be Destroyed (1970); with Hammer Films

See also 
 List of record labels
 Kinney National Company
 Kinney Parking Company
 National Kinney Corporation
 Warner Communications

References 

American companies established in 1967
American companies disestablished in 1970
Defunct mass media companies of the United States
American record labels
Entertainment companies based in California
Companies based in Burbank, California
Mass media companies established in 1967
Record labels established in 1967
Mass media companies disestablished in 1969
1967 establishments in California
1969 disestablishments in California
Defunct companies based in Greater Los Angeles
Predecessors of Warner Bros. Discovery
1969 mergers and acquisitions